The 1970 North Dakota State Bison football team was an American football team that represented North Dakota State University during the 1970 NCAA College Division football season as a member of the North Central Conference. In their fifth year under head coach Ron Erhardt, the team compiled a 9–0–1 record, finished as NCC champion, and defeated Montana in the Camellia Bowl.

Defensive back Joe Cichy received first-team honors on the 1970 Little All-America college football team, and tackle Dan Green received third-team honors.

Schedule

References

North Dakota State
North Dakota State Bison football seasons
North Central Conference football champion seasons
College football undefeated seasons
North Dakota State Bison football